Hispania Carthaginensis was a  Roman province segregated from Hispania Tarraconensis in the new division of Hispania by emperor Diocletian in 298.

The capital of the new province was settled in Carthago Nova, now Cartagena.

It encompassed the southern part of the Mediterranean coast of Spain, except that belonging to Hispania Baetica, and the inland of the country.

See also 
Romanization of Hispania

Late Roman provinces
History of Cartagena, Spain
Roman provinces in Hispania
States and territories established in the 290s
298 establishments
Spain in the Roman era